Neely Henry Lake is located on the Coosa River near Gadsden, Alabama.  The lake was formed by the Neely Henry Dam (57 ft high), built in 1966 by Alabama Power Company for hydroelectric power and recreation.

Completed on June 2, 1966, the dam and reservoir were named for H. Neely Henry, a senior executive vice-president of Alabama Power.  The dam has a 72,900 kilowatt generating capacity; the lake covers 11,200 surface acres (45.3 km2) with a total capacity of 129,800 acre-feet and about 339 miles of shoreline.  The nearest town is Ohatchee, Alabama to the East of the dam, and Ragland, Alabama to the West.  It is an excellent recreational lake with fishing opportunities for largemouth bass, spotted bass, bluegill and other sunfish, crappie, catfish, striped bass, hybrid and white bass.  Alabama Power maintains three public access sites on the lake.

References

External links 

www.neelyhenry.com Information about Lake Neely Henry
lakes.alabamapower.com Alabama Power Lake Information

Bodies of water of Calhoun County, Alabama
Bodies of water of Etowah County, Alabama
Landmarks in Alabama
Reservoirs in Alabama
Bodies of water of St. Clair County, Alabama
Hydroelectric power plants in Alabama
Alabama Power dams